Luciola antennalis, is a species of firefly beetle found in Sri Lanka.

Dorsal surface yellow with 4 to 7 depressed antennal segments.

References 

Lampyridae
Insects of Sri Lanka
Beetles described in 1905